Angeles may refer to:

Places
Los Angeles, the largest city in California and the Western US
Angeles City, the most populous city in Central Luzon, Philippines
Angeles National Forest, a national forest on the outskirts of Los Angeles
Angeles Forest Highway, a road in said forest
Angeles River, Puerto Rico
Mount Angeles, Washington

Music
Angeles (band), an American rock band
"Angeles", a 1991 song by Enya from her album Shepherd Moons
"Angeles", a 1993 song by Engelbert Humperdinck from his album Yours: Quiereme Mucho
"Angeles", a 1997 song by Elliott Smith from his album Either/Or
Angeles Records, an American hip hop label

Other uses
 Angeles (name), including a list of people with the name
 Ángeles S.A., a 2007 Spanish film

See also
 Angel (disambiguation)
 Los Angeles (disambiguation)